Sally of the Sawdust is a 1925 American silent comedy film directed by D. W. Griffith and starring W. C. Fields. It was based on the 1923 stage musical Poppy. Fields would later star in a second film version, Poppy (1936).

Plot
Because she married a circus performer, Judge Foster (Erville Alderson) casts out his only daughter. Just before her death a few years later, she leaves her little girl Sally (Carol Dempster) in the care of her friend McGargle (W. C. Fields), a good-natured crook, juggler and fakir. Sally grows up in this atmosphere and is unaware of her parentage. McGargle, realizing his responsibility to the child, gets a job with a carnival company playing at Great Meadows, where the Fosters live. A real estate boom has made them wealthy. Sally is a hit with her dancing. Peyton (Alfred Lunt), the son of Judge Foster's friend, falls in love with Sally. To save him, the Judge arranges to have McGargle and Sally arrested. McGargle escapes, but Sally is hunted down and brought back. McGargle, hearing of Sally's plight, steals a Flivver, and after many delays, reaches the courtroom and presents proof of Sally's parentage. The Judge dismisses the case and his wife takes Sally in her arms, but Peyton's claim is stronger and she agrees to become his wife. McGargle is persuaded to remain and is found an outlet for his peculiar talents in selling real estate.

Cast

Production
Sally of the Sawdust was filmed at Paramount Pictures' Long Island studios.

References

External links

Trailer to 

1925 films
1925 comedy films
American silent feature films
American black-and-white films
Circus films
Films directed by D. W. Griffith
United Artists films
Silent American comedy films
Articles containing video clips
1920s American films
1920s English-language films